Tommie-Amber Pirie is a Canadian actress. She is most noted for her role as Claire in Michael: Every Day, for which she was a Canadian Screen Award nominee for Best Actress in a Comedy Series at the 1st Canadian Screen Awards in 2013.

Early life 
Originally from Ottawa, Pirie was a competitive figure skater at the junior level before turning to acting.

Career 
Pirie had her first acting role as Sally in the television miniseries H2O, and her first major role as Sarah, the younger sister of Jay Baruchel's character Leon, in the film The Trotsky.

She has also appeared in the films such as, The F Word, How to Plan an Orgy in a Small Town, Below Her Mouth, The Go-Getters, James vs. His Future Self and The Retreat, and the television series Long Story, Short and Bitten.

In addition to her Canadian Screen Award nomination, she was nominated for Best Performance by an Actress by the Toronto chapter of the ACTRA Awards in 2012.

Filmography

Film

Television

References

External links
 

21st-century Canadian actresses
Canadian film actresses
Canadian television actresses
Actresses from Ottawa
Living people
Year of birth missing (living people)